Ryszard Świętochowski (17 September 1882 in Warsaw – 1941 in Auschwitz) was a Polish politician, publicist and engineer. He was the son of Aleksander Świętochowski.

Swiętochowski was an activist of SP and People's Party, co-worker of general Władysław Sikorski, editor-in-chief of the weekly magazines Zwrot and Odnowa and author of several scientific works in physics.

During the Second World War and the German occupation of Poland, he was murdered in the German concentration camp Auschwitz.

1882 births
1941 deaths
20th-century Polish engineers
Polish publicists
Politicians from Warsaw
Politicians who died in Nazi concentration camps
Polish civilians killed in World War II
Polish people who died in Auschwitz concentration camp